Athletics at the 1993 Games of the Small States of Europe were held in Valetta, Malta between 25 and 29 May.

Medal summary

Men

Women

Medal table

References

Games of the Small States of Europe
1993 Games of the Small States of Europe
1993
1993 Games of the Small States of Europe